George Westinghouse Jones House, also known by the Welsh name of Caermarthen, is a historic home located in the Town of Niskayuna in Schenectady County, New York.  It was built about 1900 and designed by the architectural firm of Rutan & Russell.  It is a rambling, -story gable-roofed frame residence in the Shingle Style.  it features a high stone foundation, steeply pitched gable roof, a wraparound verandah, hipped roof dormers, and five tall brick chimneys. Its original owner was George Westinghouse Jones, who was a cousin of industrialist George Westinghouse and business administrator for the firm's Schenectady interests.

It was listed on the National Register of Historic Places in 2004.

References

Houses on the National Register of Historic Places in New York (state)
Houses in Schenectady County, New York
Shingle Style architecture in New York (state)
Houses completed in 1900
National Register of Historic Places in Schenectady County, New York